Kevork Mardikian (alternative spelling Kifork Mardekyan     born in Latakia, Syria on 14 July 1954) is a former Syrian football midfielder. He captained the Syrian national team between 1979 and 1985.

He played for Syria in the 1980 Asian Cup, 1984 Asian Cup and the 1980 Moscow Olympics. He has been described as "one of the best Syrian footballers of all time".

As coach, Mardikian has coached Syria in various youth teams such as Syria U-20 (successful qualification to 2005 FIFA World Youth Championship) and Syria U-17.

His son Mardik Mardikian is also a footballer.

References

Living people
People from Latakia
Hutteen Latakia players
Syrian footballers
Syria international footballers
Footballers at the 1980 Summer Olympics
Olympic footballers of Syria
1980 AFC Asian Cup players
1984 AFC Asian Cup players
1954 births
Syrian people of Armenian descent
Syrian football managers
Association football midfielders
Syria national football team managers
Expatriate football managers in the United Arab Emirates
Mardikian family